Queenwood School for Girls, often abbreviated as Queenwood, is a multi-campus independent non-denominational Christian  primary and secondary day school for girls, located in the suburb of Mosman, on the Lower North Shore of Sydney, New South Wales, Australia.

Established in 1925 by Miss Grace Lawrance (who was an alumna of Wenona) and named after the Queenwood Ladies' College in East Sussex, Queenwood has a non-selective enrolment policy and currently caters for approximately 1,000 students from Year K to Year 12.

The school is affiliated with the Association of Heads of Independent Schools of Australia (AHISA), the Alliance of Girls' Schools Australasia, and is a member of the Association of Heads of Independent Girls' Schools (AHIGS).

History

Queenwood was established on 21 September 1925 by Grace Lawrance, assisted by Beatrice Rennie, as an independent, day and boarding school for girls.

The two women had met in 1918, at the Glennie Memorial School in Toowoomba, Queensland, where Lawrance was Principal, and Rennie first assistant-mistress. They travelled to England in 1921, where they visited many of the best girls' schools. Both women resigned from the Glennie in 1925, with the intention of founding a school in Sydney. They chose a large, old house at 47 Mandalong Road, Mosman. Their entrepreneurial courage was remarkable since neither enjoyed perfect health.

The school was named "Queenwood" after the now defunct Queenwood Ladies' College at Eastbourne, in East Sussex, on the south coast of England, which had been founded by Miss Lawrance's mother in 1871, and which was similarly located on a hill overlooking the sea. The site at Mandalong Road was chosen because of its view over Balmoral Beach and its northeasterly aspect. As Queenwood grew, the school expanded to a second site at Mandalong Road.

By 1926, Queenwood was a registered secondary school, and three years later Miss Rennie was teaching, running the school and caring for her ailing co-Principal. In 1932, a combination of the Depression, Lawrance's death in November, and Rennie's illnesses, meant that Violet Maude Medway often assisted in managing the school. The two women became co-Principals in 1942. Queenwood prospered despite the Depression and Second World War, and by 1950, Rennie was president of the New South Wales branch of the Headmistresses' Association of Australia. The school phased out its boarding program in the 1950s.

In 1962, Rennie retired as co-Principal but the school remained her home as she worked in the library and helped with the students, as far as her health permitted. In 1966, the school became a non-profit private company, named Queenwood School for Girls Ltd.

The Junior School moved to the Medway Centre at Queen Street, Mosman in 1990, and later the Visual Arts Department moved to a separate site on The Esplanade at Balmoral Beach.

Principals
The following individuals have served as Principal of the Queenwood School for Girls:

Campus
Queenwood has four campuses, each located in suburban Mosman. The site at 47 Mandalong Road on which Queenwood was founded, was completely redeveloped in 2002/03 and became operational in Term 4 of 2003. This campus caters for the Senior School (Years 7 to 12), and houses most of the academic activities of the School, including classrooms, integrated technology, a 600-seat tiered Auditorium, an underground car park, library, and music and drama facilities. In 2009/10 the Lawrance Campus at 44 Mandalong Road was completely redeveloped and opened for use in Term 3, 2010. The building has a 25m pool, a learn to swim pool, a 110-seat lecture theatre and numerous class rooms and science labs.

Curriculum
Queenwood is registered and accredited with the New South Wales Board of Studies, and therefore follows the mandated curriculum for all years. It offers the International Baccalaureate Diploma Program and the Higher School Certificate in Years 11 and 12.

Junior School
In the Junior School, the curriculum is based on the six primary Key Learning Areas of English, Mathematics, Human Society and its Environment, including languages other than English, Science and Technology, Creative and Practical Arts, and Physical Education, Personal Development and Health.

Senior School
Years 7 to 10 students are offered a range of curriculum choices. In Year 7, the school follows a mandatory pattern of subject choices. Year 8 students are introduced to six new subjects from which they select two for further study. In Year 9, whilst the mandated core subjects must be completed, students choose three electives which may include those studied in Year 8 or may consist of new subjects or a combination of both. 
In Year 11, students are prepared for either the Higher School Certificate (HSC) or the International Baccalaureate (IB), depending on their preference. Those choosing to complete the HSC must study at least ten units including: at least two units of English; at least one unit from the Key Learning Area Group 1 of Science, Mathematics and Technological and Applied Studies; and at least one unit from the Key Learning Area Group 2 of Languages Other Than English, Human Society and its Environment, Creative Arts, Personal Development, Health and Physical Education.

House system
As with most Australian schools, Queenwood utilises a house system through which students may participate in intra-school competitions and activities. The school currently has three houses: 
Queen
Wood
School

The motto
The motto is, Per Aspera ad Astra, or 'through struggles to the stars.' (Extended by Miss Rennie to be: 'it is only by struggling to overcome difficulties that we can hope ever to reach our highest ideals.') Miss Rennie said, "Per Aspera precedes Ad Astra and so it is that strength and courage are necessary, for the highest and best are not attained without struggle. Self-control, self-discipline are necessary with strength, to stand up for the right and courage to stick with one's convictions."

Notable alumnae

Alumnae of Queenwood are known as Old Girls and may elect to join the school's alumnae association, the Queenwood Old Girls' Association (QOGA). Some notable 'Old Girls' of Queenwood include:

Entertainment, media and the arts
 Adelaide Clemensactress
 Shirley Hazzardwriter
 Jane Nichollseditor of Who Weekly magazine
 Dorothy Porterwriter
 Gemma Pranita (Xumsai)actress
 Madeleine St Johnwriter
 Phoebe Tonkinactress as seen in H2O: Just Add Water and The Vampire Diaries spinoff The Originals
 Anna Volskaactress
Anna McPheeDirector of the Office of Equal Opportunity for Women in the Workplace; first female Chief of Staff to a Liberal Premier in NSW
 Sue Vardon Chief Executive of the Department for Families and Communities, South Australia; inaugural CEO of Centrelink (1997–2004), Chief Executive of the Department of Correctional Services (SA) (1994–97); Telstra SA Businesswoman of the Year 2005; Recipient of the Centenary Medal 2003

Sport
 Nicola Barrfirst draft pick for the Giants in the inaugural Women's AFL season
 Holly Lincoln-Smithwater polo player
 Zali Steggallformer Olympic skier and Member for Warringah
 Talia Barnet-Hepples  national representative rowing coxswain

See also

 List of non-government schools in New South Wales

References

External links 
 Queenwood website

Girls' schools in New South Wales
Educational institutions established in 1925
Private primary schools in Sydney
Private secondary schools in Sydney
Association of Heads of Independent Girls' Schools
Nondenominational Christian schools in Sydney
Junior School Heads Association of Australia Member Schools
International Baccalaureate schools in Australia
Alliance of Girls' Schools Australasia
1925 establishments in Australia